Here Today is a 2021 American comedy-drama film directed and produced by Billy Crystal, from a screenplay that he wrote with Alan Zweibel. It stars Crystal, Tiffany Haddish, Penn Badgley, Laura Benanti, and Louisa Krause. The film was released on May 7, 2021, by Stage 6 Films.

Plot
Charlie Burnz is walking to work, having to remind himself of the directions, demonstrating that his memory isn't strong. He arrives at the studio where he has a storied career as a successful comedy screenwriter. Later, sitting in on a pitch meeting, Charlie goes on a lunch date with someone who won it at an auction. Meeting Emma Payge, she explains her cheating ex-boyfriend won the auction as Charlie is his hero. By taking his lunch date, she gets some revenge. They get on well, but Emma has a severe allergic reaction to her shellfish. Accompanying her to the hospital, she claims Charlie is her adoptive dad. He gets stuck with the bill and later has to stab her with an Epi pen. He has enjoyed himself but doubts he will see Emma again.

Charlie meets with his physician, who talks of his early stage of dementia. He hasn't told his family nor his employer. That night, Charlie attends a recorded discussion of one of his most successful movies. Interviewed by Bob Costas with the film's director Barry Levinson and lead actors Sharon Stone and Kevin Kline, Charlie forgets the names of his fellow panelists, playing it off as a joke. Afterwards, Charlie is surprised by Emma, who attends to support him, as she now genuinely likes him. She also repays him for the hospital visit. Charlie accompanies Emma to her job as a singer for a band, and is very impressed by her talent. Afterwards, he explains the unfinished novel she saw is meant to be a memoir celebrating his life with his late wife Carrie and his children Rex and Francine. Charlie admits writer's block and also has a strained relationship with the kids.

The same night, Emma asks Charlie how he met Carrie in a message. This helps him focus and he begins to write his novel. In a flashback, Charlie and Carrie met by chance while walking on the same beach. After light conversation, he invites her to his house to remove tar from her feet. They hit it off, declaring their love for each other after a few dates. Later, Charlie has a breakdown when his route to work is blocked. Then, during a live show, he has an episode. Angry at the cast member who can't enunciate properly, thereby ruining jokes with his poor performance, Charlie walks onstage. He critiques the actor and engages the crowd, the performance is lauded and goes viral. Although everyone initially thinks Charlie was simply engaged in brilliant improv, it soon becomes apparent that he is unwell. Emma rushes to the studio after seeing the live show, explaining Charlie's situation. Darrell writes a tribute to him online, providing cover for what happened. Meanwhile, Francine thinks Charlie was drunk and is disgusted.

Charlie’s granddaughter Lindsay arrives unexpectedly at his home while Emma is out. She tearfully explains that she overheard Francine blame Charlie for Carrie's death behind his back. He embraces his granddaughter, saying he will take them somewhere special to cheer her up. When Francine finds Lindsay is missing, she and Rex go to Charlie's, finding Emma also looking for him. They soon realize he took a rideshare service, so they track him to the country. As they all drive to him, Emma tells Rex and Francine about his dementia. They find Lindsay in tears as Charlie had an episode and ran into the woods without her. Realizing they are at their childhood cabin, Francine and Rex rush to find Charlie. He wholeheartedly apologizes for his past mistakes. The family tearfully embraces and forgives him, and also accepts Emma as part of the family.

Forward in time, Charlie and Emma are at the cabin on Lake Charlie with Rex, Francine, Lindsay, and Darrell. Francine and Rex reminisce about their childhood as Darrell transcribes the stories for the book. At the sunset, they all go together to the lake to watch it. Charlie sees Carrie's spirit watching it alongside them, and Charlie smiles.

Cast

 Billy Crystal as Charlie Burnz
 Tiffany Haddish as Emma Payge
 Penn Badgley as Rex Burnz
 Laura Benanti as Francine Burnz
 Louisa Krause as Carrie Burnz
 Anna Deavere Smith as Dr. Vidor
 Matthew Broussard as Roger
 Alex Brightman as Justin
 Andrew Durand as Darrell
 Max Gordon Moore as Brad
 Audrey Hsieh as Lindsay Burnz 
 Nyambi Nyambi as Dwayne St. Johnson
 Brandon Uranowitz as Gary
 Sharon Stone as herself / Iris
 Kevin Kline as himself
 Barry Levinson as himself
 Bob Costas as himself 
 Susan Pourfar as Paula

Production
In September 2019, it was announced Tiffany Haddish and Billy Crystal would star in the film and serve as producers, while Crystal would also direct from a screenplay co-written with Alan Zweibel. In October 2019, Louisa Krause, Penn Badgley, Laura Benanti, Alex Brightman, Anna Deavere Smith and Nyambi Nyambi joined the cast of the film, with principal photography commencing in New York. Filming wrapped around Thanksgiving.

Release
In April 2021, Stage 6 Films acquired distribution rights to the film, and set it for a May 7, 2021, release.

Reception

Box office 
Here Today was released alongside Wrath of Man and grossed $900,000 from 1,200 theaters in its opening weekend, finishing seventh at the box office. The film dropped 41% to $530,000 in its second weekend.

Critical response 
On review aggregator Rotten Tomatoes, 47% of 98 critics have given the film a positive review, with an average rating of 5.4/10. The website's critics consensus reads: "Here Todays well-matched stars share an infectious chemistry that's almost enough to overcome a frequently mushy mix of comedy and drama." According to Metacritic, which assigned a weighted average score of 40 out of 100 based on 23 critics, the film received "mixed or average reviews". According to PostTrak, 65% of audience members gave the film a positive score, with 46% saying they would definitely recommend it.

Writing for Variety, Owen Gleiberman called the film "both winning and mushy" and said: "What's good about the movie is that Crystal, who co-wrote and directed it, has an inside knowledge of the showbiz comedy world (as he demonstrated in 1992 when he directed and starred in the acerbically accomplished Mr. Saturday Night), and the prickly vivacity with which he portrays it roots the movie in something real."

References

External links
 

American comedy films
Films directed by Billy Crystal
Films with screenplays by Billy Crystal
Films with screenplays by Alan Zweibel
Films shot in New York City
Stage 6 Films films
2020s English-language films
2020s American films